known world may refer to:
the extent of geographic knowledge of a given culture at a given historical period, see history of geography
Early world maps lists a number of maps showing the known world from the perspective of various historical periods
Ecumene, a Greek geographical concept for the inhabited or known parts of the world
The Known World, a 2003 historical novel by Edward P. Jones
The Known World of Mystara, a campaign setting in the role playing game Dungeons & Dragons

See also
History of cartography
Old World, consists of Africa, Europe, and Asia
Ptolemy's world map, a map of the world known to Hellenistic society in the 2nd century
Midgard, a Germanic mythological concept for the abode of man
Tianxia, a Chinese concept for "all under heaven"